Yavari may refer to:

Yavari (ship)
Yavari River
Yavari, Iran, a village in Kermanshah Province, Iran